My Motherland is a 1933 Soviet film directed by Iosif Kheifits and Aleksandr Zarkhi.

Plot 
As a result of the Chinese attack on the Chinese-East Railway, the Russians take prisoner of a soldier named Van. Together with his officer, Van escapes from captivity, but a conflict grows between them.

Starring 
 Bari Haydarov as Van
 Gennadiy Michurin as Vas'ka
 Aleksandr Melnikov as Vasya
 Yanina Zheymo as Olya
 Yun Fa-shu as The Manchurian officer
 Konstantin Nazarenko as Malyutka
 Lyudmila Semyonova as Lyudmila
 Oleg Zhakov as Alyabyev

References

External links 

1933 films
1930s Russian-language films
Soviet drama films
1933 drama films
Soviet black-and-white films